Gordon Town is a settlement in Saint Andrew Parish, Jamaica. It has a population of 1,067 as of 2009. Reggae musician Judah Eskender Tafari was born in Gordon Town, as was Henry Arthur Campbell (1873-1953), electrical engineer.

In 2019, Gordon Town Square was named after Louise Bennett-Coverley.

References

Populated places in Saint Andrew Parish, Jamaica